The 1995 UCF Golden Knights football season was the seventeenth season for the team and eleventh for Gene McDowell as the head coach of the Golden Knights. The team finished with a 6–5 overall record. The season marked UCF's last in Division I-AA, as the Golden Knights moved to Division I-A in 1996. The 1995 season also featured the debut of UCF's new freshman quarterback, Daunte Culpepper.

The season started out on a high note, as the Golden Knights defeated Div. I-AA #5 Eastern Kentucky behind 254 yards passing by Culpepper in his first career game. After the season, Marquette Smith was drafted by the Carolina Panthers.

Marc Daniels debuted as the new radio voice of the Knights on the UCF Radio Network.

Schedule

References

UCF
UCF Knights football seasons
UCF Golden Knights football